The Hotel Chelsea (also the Chelsea Hotel or the Chelsea) is a hotel in Manhattan, New York City, built between 1883 and 1885. The 250-unit hotel is located at 222 West 23rd Street, between Seventh and Eighth Avenues, in the neighborhood of Chelsea.

It has been the home of numerous writers, musicians, artists and actors. Though the Chelsea no longer accepts new long-term residents, the building is still home to many who lived there before the change in policy. Arthur C. Clarke wrote 2001: A Space Odyssey while staying at the Chelsea, and poets Allen Ginsberg and Gregory Corso chose it as a place for philosophical and artistic exchange. It is also known as the place where the writer Dylan Thomas was staying in room 205 when he became ill and died several days later, in a local hospital, of pneumonia on November 9, 1953, and where Nancy Spungen, girlfriend of Sid Vicious of the Sex Pistols, was found stabbed to death on October 12, 1978. Arthur Miller wrote a short piece, "The Chelsea Affect", describing life at the Chelsea Hotel in the early 1960s.

The building has been a designated New York City landmark since 1966, and on the National Register of Historic Places since 1977.

History 

Built between 1883 and 1885 and opened for initial occupation in 1884, the twelve-story red-brick building that is now the Hotel Chelsea was one of the city's first private apartment cooperatives. It was designed by Philip Hubert of the firm of Hubert, Pirrson & Company in a style that has been described variously as Queen Anne Revival and Victorian Gothic. Among its distinctive features are the delicate, flower-ornamented iron balconies on its facade, which were constructed by J.B. and J.M. Cornell and its grand staircase, which extends upward twelve floors. Generally, this staircase is only accessible to registered guests, although the hotel does offer monthly tours to others. At the time of its construction, the building was the tallest in New York.

Hubert and Pirsson had created a "Hubert Home Club" in 1880 for "The Rembrandt," a six-story building on West 57th Street intended as housing for artists. This early cooperative building had rental units to help defray costs, and also provided servants as part of the building staff. The success of this model led to other "Hubert Home Clubs," and the Chelsea was one of them. Initially successful, its surrounding neighborhood constituted the center of New York's theater district. However, within a few years the combination of economic stresses, the suspicions of New York's middle class about apartment living, the opening up of Upper Manhattan and the plentiful supply of houses there, and the relocation of the city's theater district bankrupted the Chelsea.

The building reopened as a hotel in 1905, which was later managed by Knott Hotels and resident manager A. R. Walty. After the hotel went bankrupt, it was purchased in 1939 by Joseph Gross, Julius Krauss, and David Bard, and these partners managed the hotel together until the early 1970s. Stanley Bard, David Bard's son, became manager after Gross and Krauss' deaths.

On June 18, 2007, the hotel's board of directors ousted Bard as the hotel's manager. Dr. Marlene Krauss, the daughter of Julius Krauss, and David Elder, the grandson of Joseph Gross and the son of playwright and screenwriter Lonne Elder III, replaced Stanley Bard with the management company BD Hotels NY; that firm has since been terminated as well.

The hotel was sold to real estate developer Joseph Chetrit for $80 million in 2011 and stopped taking reservations for new guests, to begin renovations. Long-time residents were allowed to remain in the building, some of them protected by state rent regulations. The renovations prompted complaints to the city by the remaining tenants of health hazards caused by the construction.  The city's Building Department investigated these complaints and found no major violations. In November 2011, the management ordered all of the hotel's many artworks taken off the walls, supposedly for their protection and cataloging, a move which some tenants interpreted as a step towards forcing them out as well. In 2013, Ed Scheetz became the Chelsea Hotel's new owner after buying back five properties from Chetrit and David Bistricer. In 2016, Ira Drukier, Richard Born and Sean MacPherson bought the Chelsea Hotel.

Located in the Chelsea since 1930 is the restaurant El Quijote which was owned by the same family until 2017 when it was sold to the new owner of the hotel. In late March 2018 the eatery also closed for renovations.

In February 2022 Hotel Chelsea and El Quijote quietly reopened.

Notable residents

Literary artists 
During its lifetime Hotel Chelsea has provided a home to many famous writers and thinkers including Mark Twain, O. Henry, Herbert Huncke, Dylan Thomas, Arthur C. Clarke, Sam Shepard, Arthur Miller, Tennessee Williams, Jack Kerouac, Brendan Behan, Thomas Wolfe, Valerie Solanas, William S. Burroughs, Allen Ginsberg, Quentin Crisp, Gregory Corso, Arnold Weinstein, Catherine Leroy, and James Schuyler.

Delmore Schwartz, author of "In Dreams Begin Responsibilities", spent the last few years of his life in seclusion at the Hotel Chelsea.

Charles R. Jackson, author of The Lost Weekend, died by suicide in his room on September 21, 1968. Joseph O'Neill and his wife moved there in 1998, and they raised three sons there; the Chelsea Hotel plays a significant role in his novel Netherland.

Actors and film directors 

The hotel has been a home to actors, film directors, and comedians such as  Ethan Hawke, and Edie Sedgwick.

The filmmaker Rosa von Praunheim, who temporarily resided in the hotel, portrayed the artist and long-term resident of the hotel Ching Ho Cheng for his film Tally Brown, New York.

Musicians 
Much of the Hotel Chelsea's history has been colored by the musicians who have resided there. Some of the most prominent names include Chet Baker, Grateful Dead, Nico, Tom Waits, Patti Smith, Jim Morrison, Iggy Pop, Virgil Thomson, Jeff Beck, Bob Dylan, Chick Corea, Alexander Frey, Dee Dee Ramone, Alice Cooper, Édith Piaf, Johnny Thunders, Mink DeVille, Alejandro Escovedo, Marianne Faithfull, Cher, John Cale, Joni Mitchell, Robbie Robertson,  Bette Midler, Pink Floyd, Jimi Hendrix, Canned Heat, J.D. Stooks, Jacques Labouchere, Sid Vicious, Richard Barone, Lance Loud and Rufus Wainwright.

Madonna lived at the Chelsea in the early 1980s, returning in 1992 to shoot photographs for her book, Sex, in room 822. Leonard Cohen, who lived in room 424, and Janis Joplin, in room 411, had an affair there in 1968, and Cohen later wrote two songs about it, "Chelsea Hotel" and "Chelsea Hotel #2". Bob Dylan wrote the epic song 'Sad-eyed lady of the lowlands' there and Nico's song 'Chelsea Girls would also seem to be based upon it.  Jobriath spent his last years in the pyramid-topped apartment on the Chelsea's rooftop where he died of complications due to AIDS in August 1983. The Kills wrote much of their album No Wow at the Chelsea presumably between the years 2003 to 2005. Jorma Kaukonen wrote the song "Third Week in the Chelsea" for Jefferson Airplane's 1971 album Bark after spending three weeks living in the Chelsea.

Visual artists 

The hotel has featured and collected the work of the many visual artists who have passed through. Frank Bowling, Doris Chase, Bernard Childs, Claudio Edinger, Brett Whiteley, Ching Ho Cheng, Larry Rivers and from 1961 to 1970 several of his French nouveau réalistes friends like Yves Klein (who wrote his Manifeste de l'hôtel Chelsea there in April 1961), Arman, Martial Raysse, Jean Tinguely, Niki de Saint Phalle, Christo, Daniel Spoerri or Alain Jacquet (who left a version of his Déjeuner sur l'herbe from 1964 in the hotel lobby featuring other pieces by Larry Rivers or Arman), Francesco Clemente, Julian Schnabel, Joe Andoe, David Remfry, Diego Rivera, Ryah Ludins, Robert Crumb, Ellen Cantor, Jasper Johns, Tom Wesselmann, Claes Oldenburg, Herbert Gentry, Willem de Kooning, Stella Waitzkin, Robert Mapplethorpe (room 1017, with Patti Smith). The Australian Vali Myers moved into the hotel in 1971 and remained there for 43 years.

 The painter Alphaeus Philemon Cole lived there for 35 years until his death in 1988, aged 112, at which point he was the oldest verified man alive. The sculptor René Shapshak and his wife lived here; his bust of Harry Truman and reliefs were in the lobby.

Fashion designers 
Charles James, credited with being America's first couturier who influenced fashion in the 1940s and 1950s, moved into the Chelsea in 1964. He died there of pneumonia in 1978. Elizabeth Hawes, a designer best remembered for her critique of the fashion industry in her book, Fashion is Spinach (1938), lived in the Chelsea up until her death in 1971. When Billy Reid started his brand in 1998, it was a one-man operation; he lived in the Garment District, while a room at the Chelsea served as an office, studio and showroom. After returning to New York city in 2001 during a sabbatical, Natalie "Alabama" Chanin spent nine months living in the Chelsea Hotel. During her stay, she met many friends, future collaborators, and designed her first collection of 200 upcycled, hand sewn t-shirts, a project that would become Project Alabama and eventually Alabama Chanin. As Chanin's career took off as a pioneer of sustainable design, she continued to show her collections in rooms 409 and 411 at the Chelsea Hotel until 2003.

Warhol 
Hotel Chelsea is often associated with the Warhol superstars, as Andy Warhol and Paul Morrissey directed Chelsea Girls (1966), a film about his Factory regulars and their lives at the hotel.

In popular culture

Films and television 
The hotel has been featured in:

 Chelsea Girls (1966), by Andy Warhol, was shot at the Chelsea.
 Portrait of Jason (1967), by Shirley Clarke, was shot at the Chelsea.
 An American Family (1973, PBS) – an episode of the pioneering reality TV series was mostly filmed at the Chelsea.
 Tally Brown, New York (1979), by Rosa von Praunheim.
 Arena (1981) – the popular BBC arts documentary series featured an episode, "Chelsea Hotel".
 Sid and Nancy (1986), by Alex Cox.
 9½ Weeks (1986) Director Adrian Lyne shot a scene on location, where Mickey Rourke and Kim Basinger have a sex date with a prostitute involved.
 Some scenes in Romeo Is Bleeding (1993)—which, like Sid and Nancy, stars Gary Oldman—were filmed and are set in the Chelsea.
 Part of Léon: The Professional (1994), by Luc Besson, was shot there, although it was set in an apartment block.
 Midnight in Chelsea (1997), directed by Mark Pellington, a video to a track from the 1997 Jon Bon Jovi solo album Destination Anywhere.
 Chelsea Walls (2001), directed by Ethan Hawke, a movie about a new generation of artists living at the hotel.
 Chelsea on the Rocks (2008), a documentary film directed by Abel Ferrara.
 Hotel Chelsea (2009), a horror film about a Japanese couple staying at the hotel.
 Dreaming Walls: Inside the Chelsea Hotel (2022), a documentary executive-produced by Martin Scorsese.

Music 
The hotel is featured in many songs, including:

 "Sara" by Bob Dylan
 "Chelsea Hotel #2" by Leonard Cohen, later covered by various artists
 "Midnight in Chelsea" by Bon Jovi
 "Chelsea Hotel '78" by Alejandro Escovedo
 "Chelsea Girl" by Nico
 "Hotel Chelsea Nights" by Ryan Adams
 "Dear Abbie" by Kinky Friedman
 "Like a Drug I Never Did Before" by Joey Ramone
 "The Chelsea Hotel" by Graham Nash
 "Third Week in the Chelsea" by Jefferson Airplane
 “Chelsea Hotel” by Dan Bern
 “Twenty-Third Street” by Bill Morrissey
 "The Chelsea Hotel Oral Sex Song" (2001) by Jeffrey Lewis
 "Chelsea Hotel" on Meshell Ndegeocello's 2011 album Weather
 "Godspeed" by Anberlin on their 2007 album Cities
 "Chelsea" by Phoebe Bridgers on her 2017 album Stranger in the Alps
 "Bruce Wayne Campbell Interviewed on the Roof of the Chelsea Hotel, 1979", about Jobriath, by Okkervil River on their 2008 album The Stand Ins references the hotel in the title, but not in the lyrics.

Books

References

External links 

 
 Chelsea Hotel – New York Architecture images
 360° Panoramas of Chelsea Hotel before 2011–2012 renovations
 

Condominiums and housing cooperatives in Manhattan
Beat Generation
Hotel buildings on the National Register of Historic Places in Manhattan
Hotel buildings completed in 1885
Chelsea Hotel
Chelsea, Manhattan
New York City Designated Landmarks in Manhattan